Pachylaelaps bocharovae is a species of mite in the family Pachylaelapidae.

References

Acari
Animals described in 1978